The 1996–1997 Vendée Globe is a non-stop solo Round the World Yacht Race for IMOCA 50 and IMOCA 60 class yachts this is the third edition of the race starting on the th November 1996 from Les Sables-d'Olonne.

Summary
Another heavy-weather start in the Bay of Biscay knocked Nándor Fa and Didier Munduteguy out of the race early, and several others returned to the start for repairs before continuing. The rest of the fleet raced to the Southern Ocean, where a second attrition began: Yves Parlier and Isabelle Autissier broke rudders, leaving Christophe Auguin to lead the way into the south.

The race was won by Christophe Auguin. Catherine Chabaud, sixth and last, was the first woman to finish the race.

The book Godforsaken Sea by Derek Lundy profiles the 1996–1997 running of the race.

Incidents

Tragic Loss of Life - Gerry Roufs
The yacht Groupe LG 2 and it Canadian sailor Gerry Roufs were lost in the Southern Ocean; his body was never found, but his boat was found five months later off the Chilean Coast.

Retirement Causes
Heavy weather took a serious toll on the sailors in the far Southern Ocean.

Unofficial competitor Raphaël Dinelli's boat capsized, and he was rescued by Pete Goss. Then, within a few hours of each other, two other boats capsized, with both rescues performed by the Royal Australian Navy.

Pete Goss was later awarded the Légion d'honneur for his rescue of Dinelli. The capsize of several boats in this race prompted tightening up of the safety rules for entrants, particularly regarding boat safety and stability.

Other Incidents

Results

Table: Order of Finish, 1996–1997 Vendée Globe

Gallery

Competitors

Entries Gallery

Entries Boats
Fifteen skippers started the race a qualification passage was required to validate the registration of each boat, this course could have been carried out as part of another sailing race.

References

External links
 
 Official You Tube Channel
 

Vendée Globe
Vendée Globe
Vendée Globe
Vendée Globe